Manpreet Kaur (born 6 July 1990) is an Indian professional Olympic shot putter. Born in Ambala, her gold-medal winning performance of 18.86m at the 2017 Asian Grand Prix in Jinhua, China turned out to be a world-leading throw, taking her to the No. 1 spot in the rankings. She also holds the Indian national record 17.96m in Women's Shot Put. Kaur was qualified to represented India at Summer Olympics at Rio 2016 in shot put.

Early life 
Kaur is the eldest of three siblings. When she was 13 years old, her father passed away. Her mother was paralyzed in 2006. She developed an interest in athletics through father and her cousins who were also into sports. One of her cousins was a university-level 100m sprinter and other is a discus thrower, while her sister-in-law was also a shot putter. She initially trained for a year in the 100m, but her brother whom she trained under felt she would do better in shot put and she switched. She hails from Sahauli village from Patiala and works at the Indian Railways.

Career 
Kaur placed 9th in the 5th IAAF World Youth Championships in 2007 at Ostrova. In 2010, she took a 3-year hiatus and returned to break an 18-year-old national record in women's shot put. In 2015, she won the Gold medal scoring a 17.96m throw at the 55th National Open Athletics Championship at Kolkata.

2016 Summer Olympics 
Kaur was the only Indian woman to qualify for the Rio 2016 Olympics in her field.

Asian Grand Prix Athletics 
Kaur clinched a gold in the first leg of the Asian Grand Prix Athletics Meet with a national record and world season-leading effort. She set the national record with her best throw of 18.86m. With this performance, she also qualified for the IAAF World Championships to be held in August in London. The entry standard for women's shot put in the World Championships stands at 17.75m.

Asian Athletics Championship 
Kaur later took the gold medal at the 2017 Asian Athletics Championship in Odisha in July.

Suspension 
Kaur was tested positive for steroids four times in 2017. She began serving a 4 year period of suspension beginning July 20, 2017, and as a consequence she had to forfeit her gold medals and national record.

Personal 
She is married to Karamjeet Singh, a university level shot putter who is also her trainer. The couple have a daughter.

References

External links

Indian female shot putters
21st-century Indian women
21st-century Indian people
Sportswomen from Punjab, India
Athletes (track and field) at the 2016 Summer Olympics
Olympic athletes of India
Living people
1990 births
People from Patiala district
Athletes from Punjab, India
Athletes (track and field) at the 2022 Commonwealth Games
Commonwealth Games competitors for India
South Asian Games gold medalists for India
South Asian Games medalists in athletics